Henri Adolphe Franconi (1801 – 2 November 1855) was a French playwright and circus performer.

A grandson of Antonio Franconi and son of Henri Franconi, he succeeded him in 1827 as managing director of the Cirque-Olympique. He specialized in training horses. In 1835, he forged an association with Louis Dejean in order to establish a circus tent on the Champs-Élysées, at the Carré Marigny.

He died of a heart attack at the Cirque-Olympique in 1855.

Works 
1819: Le Soldat laboureur, mimodrama en 1 act
1828: Le Chien du régiment, ou l'Exécution militaire, melodrama in 1 act, with Henri Franconi
1828: Le Drapeau, military melodrama in 2 acts, a show with Louis Ponet and Auguste Anicet-Bourgeois
1828: L'éléphant du roi de Siam, mimodrama in nine tableaux, with Léopold Chandezon and Ferdinand Laloue, (mise-en-scène)
1830, L'Empereur, historical events in 5 actes and 18 tableaux, with Ferdinand Laloue and Auguste Lepoitevin de L'Égreville
1855: Le Cavalier : cours d'équitation pratique, Michel Lévy brothers

Bibliography 
 Artaud de Montor, Encyclopédie des gens du monde, 1839, 
 Alphonse Karr, Notice nécrologique, in Les Bourdonnements du siècle issue 25, 25 November 1855
 Camille Dreyfus, André Berthelot, La Grande encyclopédie: inventaire raisonné des sciences..., 1886, 
 Henry Lyonnet, Dictionnaire des comédiens français, 1911, 

19th-century French dramatists and playwrights
French circus performers
1801 births
1855 deaths
Burials at Père Lachaise Cemetery